Deanne Crothers is a Canadian politician, who was elected to the Legislative Assembly of Manitoba in the 2011 election. She represented the electoral district of St. James as a member of the Manitoba New Democratic Party caucus. On November 8, 2013 she was announced as the Special Envoy for Military Affairs. On November 3, 2014 she was named Minister of Healthy Living and Seniors.

Crothers contested the 2016 election for St. James but was defeated by her Progressive Conservative opponent.

Electoral record

References

External links
 

Women government ministers of Canada
Living people
Members of the Executive Council of Manitoba
New Democratic Party of Manitoba MLAs
Politicians from Winnipeg
Women MLAs in Manitoba
21st-century Canadian politicians
21st-century Canadian women politicians
Year of birth missing (living people)